Professional services are occupations in the service sector requiring special training in the arts or sciences. Some professional services, such as architects, accountants, engineers, doctors, and lawyers require the practitioner to hold professional degrees or licenses and possess specific skills. Other professional services involve providing specialist business support to businesses of all sizes and in all sectors; this can include tax advice, supporting a company with accounting, IT services, public relations services or providing management services.

Definition 
Many industry groups have been used for academic research, while looking at professional services firms, making a clear definition hard to attain. Some work has been directed at better defining professional service firms (PSF). In particular, Von Nordenflycht generated a taxonomy of professional service firms, defining four types:

 Classic PSFs (e.g. law and accounting firms): characterized by a high knowledge intensity, a professionalized workforce, and low capital intensity
 Professional campuses (e.g. hospitals): characterized by high knowledge intensity, a professionalized workforce, and high capital intensity
 Neo-PSFs (e.g. management consultants): characterized by high knowledge intensity and a low capital intensity
 Technology developers (e.g. R&D firms, biotechs): characterized by high knowledge intensity and a high capital intensity

Frameworks such as this aid the ability of managers and academics to better understand how such firms manage themselves and how to judge benchmark practices.

Example occupations 
There is no definitive list of occupations in professional services, but examples include the following:

 Accountant
 Actuary
 Appraiser
 Architect
 Consultant
 Evaluator
 Engineer
 Financial planner
 Geoscientist
 Investment manager
 IT consultant
 Inspector
 Lawyer
 Management consultant
 Marketing
  Public Relations
 Physician
 Supply Chain Management
 Training and development
 Urban Planner
 Veterinary physician

Provision 
Professional services can be provided by sole proprietors, partnerships or corporations. A person providing the service can often be described as a consultant. In law, barristers normally organise themselves into chambers. Businesses in other industries, such as banks and retailers, can employ individuals or teams to offer professional services for their customers. Major cities such as London and New York are leading global centres for professional services firms.

Marketing 
The marketing and selection of professional-service providers may depend on factors such as skill, knowledge, experience, reputation, capacity, ethics, and creativity. Large corporations may have a formal procurement process for engaging professional services. Prices for services, even within the same field, may vary greatly. Professional-service providers may offer fixed rates for specific work, charge in relation to the number or seniority of people engaged, or charge in relation to the success or profit generated by the project.

See also 
 Big Four auditors
 pro bono
 Professional services networks
 White-shoe firm

References

External links 
 Indicators of regulatory conditions in the professional services—Organisation for Economic Co-operation and Development
 Better Regulation of Professional Services—European Union
 Key Facts about UK Financial and Related Professional Services—TheCityUK
 Professional Service Firms—University of Cambridge
 Placement Services

Business occupations
Service industries